Ultzama (Ulzama in Spanish) is a municipality located in the province and  autonomous community of Navarre, northern Spain. Ultzama is also the name of the river from which the valley takes its name. It is located 22 km North of Pamplona, the capital city of Navarre.

Ultzama consists of a conglomeration of 14 small villages: Alkotz, Arraitz-Orkin, Auza, Cenoz, Eltso, Eltzaburu, Gorronz-Olano, Guerendiain, Ilarregi, Iraizotz, Juarbe, Lizaso, Urritzola-Galain and the capital of the municipality, Larraintzar. 
It is well known for its dairy products (cheese and cuajada).

See also
Ultzama valley

References

External links
 ULTZAMA in the Bernardo Estornés Lasa - Auñamendi Encyclopedia (Euskomedia Fundazioa) 

Municipalities in Navarre